The 1909 Cleveland Naps season was a season in American baseball. The team finished sixth in the American League with a record of 71–82, 27½ games behind the Detroit Tigers.

Regular season 

 July 19, 1909: Neal Ball of the Naps executed an unassisted triple play. He caught a line drive, touched second base and tagged the runner coming from first base.

Season standings

Record vs. opponents

Roster

Player stats

Batting

Starters by position 
Note: Pos = Position; G = Games played; AB = At bats; H = Hits; Avg. = Batting average; HR = Home runs; RBI = Runs batted in

Other batters 
Note: G = Games played; AB = At bats; H = Hits; Avg. = Batting average; HR = Home runs; RBI = Runs batted in

Pitching

Starting pitchers 
Note: G = Games pitched; IP = Innings pitched; W = Wins; L = Losses; ERA = Earned run average; SO = Strikeouts

Other pitchers 
Note: G = Games pitched; IP = Innings pitched; W = Wins; L = Losses; ERA = Earned run average; SO = Strikeouts

Notes

References 
1909 Cleveland Naps season at Baseball Reference

Cleveland Guardians seasons
Cleveland Naps season
1909 in sports in Ohio